The O. Henry Pun-Off World Championships is a yearly spoken word competition that takes place every May at the O. Henry Museum in Austin, Texas.

Started in 1978, the Pun-Off gathers fans of wordplay to celebrate the pun, which English poet and literary critic John Dryden called "the lowest and most groveling kind of wit." The event has been organized and run since 1990 by Austinite Gary Hallock. A support group of former and current contestants was formed in 1990 to formalize the unwritten rules of the competition(s) and provide guidance and support for future events. Under the umbrella title of "Punsters United Nearly Yearly" (a.k.a. PUNY) this collection of loosely knit wits continues to be the public face of the event through its website and social media. Gary Hallock retired as producer in 2015. He was replaced by emcee and 2006 Punslinger World Champion, David Gugenheim. 

The 40th Annual O. Henry Pun-Off World Championships were staged in 2017 and were promoted in Smithsonian Magazine. Videos of the 2016 champions can be found on that page. Former presidential speechwriter John Pollack documented his experience in the 1995 event in his 2011 book, "The Pun Also Rises: How the Humble Pun Revolutionized Language, Changed History, and Made Wordplay More Than Some Antics."

Participants in the annual event compete in one or both of the two areas of punning prowess: Punniest of Show, which features individuals performing a 90-second prepared piece filled with puns; and PunSlingers, which pits individual punsters in head-to-head bouts of spontaneous punning on a randomly selected variation of traditional topic themes.

From its inception, the O. Henry Pun-Off World Championships used a four-person panel of judges that offers scores of 1–10 based on performance, originality, and wit. The four scores were added together for a combined score of 4–40 for each participant. (Scores lower than 1 are raised to 1, and scores higher than 10 are lowered to 10.) The highest-scoring punster wins each event, with ties being decided by audience applause. Beginning in 2009, however, the judge panel was expanded to six people, with the highest and lowest scores discarded and the remaining four scores added together to form each participant's combined score of 4–40. This change was enacted to prevent any one judge from having the ability to disqualify a punster by giving a much lower score than the other judges.

A separate award is also given yearly for the Most Viable Punster, a title awarded by votes from each year's participants and given in honor of late punster George McClughan.

The 43rd Pun-Off took place online in 2020 due to the ongoing COVID-19 pandemic.

Inspiration
The O. Henry Pun-Off World Championships was inspired by the writings of William Sydney Porter who, while living in Austin, Texas, in the late 1800s, began using the pen name O. Henry. By the time of his death in 1910, O. Henry had published over 300 short stories including "The Ransom of Red Chief" and the Christmas classic "Gift of the Magi". His voracious vocabulary and love of language endeared him to a broad audience, but it was his trademark twisted endings that always kept curious readers coming back for more. Reading an O. Henry story is a participatory experience. Today, the Pun-Off keeps his name alive by offering lovers of wordplay and wit a platform for their literary shenanigans in front of an admiring, and sometimes mocking, audience.

Contest

For the purpose of competition and judging, a two-fold definition of a proper pun has been adopted by the O. Henry Pun-Off World Championships.

The first and most common form presented is wordplay using homonyms that deliberately exploits ambiguity between similar-sounding words for humorous or rhetorical effect.

The second accepted type of pun is a lesser used form of euphemism or double entendre, where an alternate meaning is suggested for a word for comedic effect.

References

External links
 O. Henry Pun-Off World Championships Official Site
 National Public Radio story on 2008 Pun-Off
 2Camels.com article
 Review of PunSmoke, a documentary of the O. Henry Pun-Off World Championships
 O. Henry Pun-Off video covering the 2009 event
 Articles on the Pun-Off by and about six-time winner Steve Brooks

Competitions
Festivals in Austin, Texas
Puns
Recurring events established in 1978
1978 establishments in Texas